is a Shinto shrine located in the city of Tsuruoka, Yamagata Prefecture, Japan. A former prefectural shrine under the Modern system of ranked Shinto shrines, the entire summit of Mount Kinbō behind the shrine is regarded as its honden. The mountain is designated as a National Place of Scenic Beauty. The shrine's main festival is held annually on June 15.

History
The original construction of this shrine is unknown, but it is said by shrine records to have been established in the Daidō era (806-810 AD), although other shrine records indicate that it was established in the Jōryaku era (990-995 AD) as a subsidiary of the Kinpusen Jinja in Yoshino in Yamato Province. It was a place of worship for the Northern Fujiwara of Hiraizumi during the late Heian period. Under the Shinbutsu-shūgō of the pre-modern era, it was regarded as a Shingon temple and was a training center for the Shugendō Yamabushi, and was supported by Shōnai Domain during the Edo period. In 1870, after the separation of Shinto and Buddhism, it became a "Mitake Shrine". It was renamed Kinbō Jinja in 1877.

The shrine's Heiden  has been designated a National Important Cultural Property.This structure has an inscription on one of its beams indicating that it was remodeled by Mogami Yoshimitsu in 1608, indicating that it pre-dates the start of the Edo period. It has a unique style, similar to that of a chapel found at Japanese Zen temples with a high roof and Chinese-style gable over its entrance.

See also
List of Shinto shrines
List of Places of Scenic Beauty of Japan (Yamagata)

References

External links
Official website

Shinto shrines in Yamagata Prefecture
Places of Scenic Beauty
Important Cultural Properties of Japan
Dewa Province
Tsuruoka, Yamagata
Beppyo shrines